Aroa sienna is a moth of the family Erebidae first described by George Hampson in 1891. It is found in India (Nilgiri) and Sri Lanka.

References

Moths of Asia
Moths described in 1891